There are two school districts in the United States by the name of Cornell School District:

 Cornell School District (Allegheny County, Pennsylvania)
 Cornell School District (Cornell, Wisconsin)